Esabalu is a village located on the border of Vihiga and Kisumu counties in western Kenya.

Geography 
Esabalu is located approximately 5,400 feet above sea level, and lies directly on the equator. It receives about 40 inches of rainfall per year.

Climate
Under the Köppen climate classification system, Esabalu has an Equatorial Climate (Af).

Demographics 
There are approximately 8,500 residents in Esabalu. Most of them are members of the Luhya ethnic group. It is estimated that the population density is over 1,000 people per square kilometer. The three major languages spoken in Esabalu are Luhya, Swahili, and English.

International relations

Twin towns – Sister cities 
Esabalu is twinned with:
  Amesbury, Massachusetts, United States (since 1987)

References